The waterskiing events of World Games I were held on July 25–26, 1981, at Berkeley Aquatic Park in Berkeley, California. These were the first World Games, an international quadrennial multi-sport event, and were hosted by the city of Santa Clara, California, in the United States.  A world record in tricks highlighted the first day of competition. Ana Maria Carrasco of Venezuela broke her own world record with a score of 6970.

Medalists
Sources:

Details

Men

Slalom 
Qualifying (top 8 to quarterfinals)

1. Bob LaPoint, USA, 33   2. John McElyea, USA, 32   3. Lucky Lowe, USA, 31   4. (tie) Sammy Duvall, USA; Andy Mapple, Britain;  Mike Neville, Australia, 26   7. Rick McCormick, USA, 25 ½   8. Eddy de Telder, Belgium, 25   9. Andres Granato, Italy, 23 ½   10. Glen Thurlow, Australia, 22   11. Geoff Carrington, Australia, 21 ½  12. John West, Britain, 21 ¼   13. Moshe Ganzi, Israel, 21   14. Mike Hazelwood, Britain, 20 ½   15. Peter Bryant, Britain, 20   16. Marco Mario, Italy, 19 ½   17. Varl Roberge, USA, 19   18. Juan Alvarez, Colombia, 17   19. Pedro Tuhsch, Spain 4 ½   20. Grant Covie, New Zealand, 3 ½

Quarterfinals

Bob LaPoint, USA, d. Eddy de Telder, Belgium, 21-20 ½ ; Mike Neville, Australia, d. Sammy Duvall, USA, 27 ½ - 25 ½ ; John McElyea, USA, d. Rick McCormick, USA, 27-26 ¼ ; Andy Mapple, Britain, d. Lucky Lowe, USA, 31-27 ¼ .

Semifinals

Mapple d. McElyea, 21 ½ -20 ½ ; LaPoint d. Neville, 32-24 ½ .

Final

LaPoint d. Mapple, 21-12 ½ .

Standings – 1. LaPoint. 2. Mapple. 3. Neville. 4. McElyea. 5. Lowe. 6. McCormick. 7. Duvall. 8. de Telder.

Tricks
Qualifying (top 8 to semifinals)

1. Patrice Martin, France, 8090  2. Sammy Duvall, USA, 7190  3. Mike Neville, Australia, 7120   4. Eddy de Telder, Belgium, 6900   5. Carl Roberge, USA, 6660   6. Moshe Ganzi, Israel 6120  7. Lucky Lowe,  USA, 6110   8. John West, Britain 5980  9. Mike Hazelwood, Britain, 5860   10. Guillermo Bertolo, Argentina 4680  11. Grant Covie, New Zealand 4570   12. Rick McCormick, USA 4340   13. Juan Alvarez, Colombia, 4240   14. Glen Thurlow, Australia, 4010   15. Jack Ellison, USA, 3820   16. Andy Mapple, Britain, 3600  17. Peter Bryant, Britain, 3460   18. Pedro Tuhsch, Spain, 2910   19. Geoff Carrington, Australia, 2510

Semifinals (top 4 to final)

1. Patrice Martin, France, 8040. 2. Mike Neville, Australia, 7270. 3. Sammy Duvall, USA, 7190. 4. Carl Roberge, USA, 6920. 5. Eddy de Telder, Belgium, 6270. 6. Lucky Lowe, USA, 5060. 7. John West, Britain, 4330. 8. Moshe Ganzi, Israel, 3580.

Final

1. Martin, 8420. 2. Roberge, 7660. 3. Duvall, 7370. 4. Neville, 7210.

Jumping
Qualifying (top 8 to quarterfinals)

1. Sammy Duvall, USA, 177   2. Mike Hazelwood, Britain, 176   3. Carl Roberge, USA, 172   4. Glen Thurlow, Australia, 169    5. Bob LaPoint, USA, 167   6. Moshe Ganzi, Israel, 166   7. Geoff Carrington, Australia, 163   8. Rick McCormick, 160   9. Lucky Lowe, USA, 160   10. Pedro Tuhsch, Spain, 159   11. Andres Granato, Italy, 159   12. Eddy de Telder, Belgium, 159   13. Mike Neville, Australia, 157   14. Peter Bryant, Britain, 156   15. Juan Alvarez, Colombia, 149   16. Guillermo Bertolo, Argentina, 143   17. Andy Mapple, Britain, 137

Quarterfinals

Carl Roberge, USA d. Moshe Ganzi, Israel, 171-158; Mike Hazlewood, Britain, d. Geoff Carrington, Australia, 176-156; Glen Thurlow, Australia, d. Bob LaPoint, USA, 169-164; Sammy Duvall, USA, d. Rick McCormick, USA, 175-158.

Semifinals

Hazelwood d. Roberge, 175-167; Duvall d. Thurlow, 170-169.

Final

Duvall d. Hazelwood, 174-173. 3rd place, Thurlow.

Overall (3 events)
1. Duvall. 2. Roberge. 3. Neville. 4. Lowe.

Women

Slalom
Qualifying (top 4 to semifinals)

1. Cyndi Benzel, USA, 25 ½   2. Cindy Todd, USA, 24 ½   3. Sue Fieldhouse, Australia, 23   4. Karin Roberge, 22   5. (tie) Lisa Sokolowski, Canada; Karen Bowkell, Australia, 21   7. Anita Carlman, Sweden; Ana Maria Carrasco, Venezuela 20 ½   9. Deena Brush, USA, 20 ¼   10. Karen Morse, Britain, 20   11. Silvia Rebora, Italy, 19   12. Marion Van Dijk, Netherlands, 18   13. Judy McClintock, Canada, 12 ½   14. Sue Lipplegoes, Australia, 6 ½

Semifinals

Cyndi Benzel, USA d. Karin Roberge, USA, 26-22; Sue Fieldhouse, Australia, d. Cindy Todd, USA, 28-24.

Final

Benzel d. Fieldhouse, 21-20 ½.

Standings – 1. Benzel. 2. Fieldhouse, Todd. 4. Roberge.

Tricks
Qualifying (top 4 to final)

1. Ana Maria Carrasco, Venezuela, 6970  (world record, previous record 6870, Carrasco, 1981)   2. Karin Roberge, USA, 5960   3. Anita Carlman, Sweden, 5820   4. Cyndi Benzel, USA, 4750   5.  Cindy Todd, USA, 3950   6. Lisa Sokolowski, Canada, 3850   7. Sue Fieldhouse, Australia, 3380   8. Sue Lipplegoes, Australia, 3370   9. Deena Brush, USA, 3190   10. Karen Bowkell, Australia, 2950   11. Marion Van Dijk, Netherlands, 2930   12. Judy McClintock, Canada, 2700   13. Karin Morse, Britain, 2560

Final

1. Ana Maria Carrasco, Venezuela, 6710. 2. Karin Roberge, USA, 5620. 3. Anita Carlman, Sweden, 5450. 4. Cyndi Benzel, USA, 4630.

Jumping
Qualifying

not available

Semifinals

Sue Lipplegoes, Australia, d. July McClintock, Canada, 118-112; Marion Van Dijk, Netherlands, d. Cindy Todd, USA, 115-114.

Final

Van Dijk d. Lipplegoes, 120-119. 3rd place, Todd.

Overall (3 events)
1. Carrasco. 2. Carlman. 3. Roberge. 4. Benzel.

References

1981
1981 World Games
World